The 1995 Winnipeg Blue Bombers finished in 5th place in the North Division with a 7–11 record. They faced the Baltimore Stallions in a South Division Semi-Final match, becoming the first CFL team to use the crossover rule.

Offseason

CFL Draft

Preseason

Regular season

Season Standings

Season schedule

Playoffs

South Semi-Final

Awards and records

1995 CFL All-Stars

Northern All-Star Selections

References

Winnipeg Blue Bombers seasons
Winnipeg Blue Bombers Season, 1995